Appleton Farms Grass Rides is a park in Hamilton, Massachusetts owned and maintained by The Trustees of Reservations. The land was donated by Col. and Mrs. Francis R. Appleton, Jr., in 1970.

References

The Trustees of Reservations
Open space reserves of Massachusetts
Parks in Essex County, Massachusetts
Hamilton, Massachusetts
1970 establishments in Massachusetts
Protected areas established in 1970